Lee Marvin: A Personal Portrait by John Boorman is a British-American documentary film directed by English filmmaker John Boorman about American actor Lee Marvin (1924-1987).

Synopsis
English filmmaker John Boorman, who directed Lee Marvin in Point Blank (1967) and Hell in the Pacific (1968), embarks on a quest to understand the man who had such a profound effect on his own life and work.

Cast
John Boorman - presenter
Lee Marvin - (archive footage)
Robert Filkosky
William Hurt
Jim Jarmusch
Pamela Marvin - Lee Marvin's wife
Harry Wilmer
Jess King
Robert James Raymond

Release 
The film premiered at the Chicago International Film Festival in October 1998. It was then broadcast on the BBC on 17 November 1998.

References

External links 
 

Films directed by John Boorman
1998 films
1998 documentary films
American documentary films
British documentary films
Documentary films about actors
1990s English-language films
1990s American films
1990s British films